St John the Evangelist's Church is in Warrington Road, Abram, Wigan, Greater Manchester, England.  It is an active Anglican parish church in the deanery of Wigan, the archdeaconry of Warrington, and the diocese of Liverpool.  The church was built in 1935–37 to replace an older church built in 1838 that had been damaged by mining subsidence.  It was designed by the Lancaster architect Henry Paley of Austin and Paley, and built at a cost of £11,113 (equivalent to £ in ), providing seating for 478 people.  The foundation stone of the original building was laid on 9 March 1836 by Sir Henry Gunning, and it was consecrated on 9 June 1838 by the Bishop of Chester.  The present church is constructed in stone from Darley Dale, and has a short squat west tower with a saddleback roof.  The stained glass in the west window, and two of the wall monuments in the church were moved from the old church.  The two-manual pipe organ was made by Richardson and Sons, and was also moved from the old church.  The churchyard contains the war graves of seven soldiers of World War I, and three soldiers and two airmen of World War II.

See also

List of churches in Greater Manchester
List of ecclesiastical works by Austin and Paley (1916–44)

References

Church of England church buildings in Greater Manchester
Churches completed in 1937
20th-century Church of England church buildings
Gothic Revival church buildings in Greater Manchester
Austin and Paley buildings
Anglican Diocese of Liverpool